A by-election for the constituency of Hammersmith South in the United Kingdom House of Commons was held on 24 February 1949, caused by the death of the incumbent Labour MP William Thomas Adams. The result was a hold for the Labour Party, with their candidate Thomas Williams.

Result

Previous election

References

 Craig, F. W. S. (1983) [1969]. British parliamentary election results 1918-1949 (3rd edition ed.). Chichester: Parliamentary Research Services. .

External links
Govt. Holds Another Seat, Pathé Coverage of the By-election

Hammersmith South,1949
Hammersmith South by-election
Hammersmith South by-election
Hammersmith South,1949
Hammersmith South by-election
Hammersmith